Les Agneaux is a mountain of the Massif des Écrins in Hautes-Alpes, France.
It is located in the commune of Pelvoux.

The tallest peak on the eastern side of the Écrins massif, the mountain has three different summits; the Agneau Blanc at 3,631 m, the northwest summit at 3,646 m, and the highest summit Agneau Noir. Two main ridges cross the mountain from north to south and from east to west. 

Climbs usually start from the south and the view from the top takes in all the main Écrins summits.

References

Mountains of Hautes-Alpes
Mountains of the Alps
Alpine three-thousanders